The 35th Annual Nickelodeon Kids' Choice Awards ceremony was held on April 9, 2022, at the Barker Hangar in Santa Monica, California with Miranda Cosgrove and Rob Gronkowski serving as hosts. It aired live on Nickelodeon and in a domestic simulcast with several other Paramount Global cable networks, and was broadcast live or tape delayed across all of Nickelodeon's international networks. 

As a result of the COVID-19 pandemic, it was the first Kids' Choice Awards ceremony since the 2019 show to feature a live audience. The ceremony, which was the first since the 2004 show to have two hosts, featured one thousand slimings as well as performances from Kid Cudi and Jack Harlow. Following the ceremony, a "Slime Cut" version of the show hosted by Young Dylan became available to stream on Paramount+ on April 12.

BTS continued their Guinness World Record for 'Most Nickelodeon Kids' Choice Awards blimps won by a music group', extending to six wins after winning the 'Favorite Music Group' category for the third consecutive year. This also tied them for the most wins within the 'Favorite Music Group' category with The Black Eyed Peas (who won non-consecutively in 2007, 2010, and 2011), One Direction (who also won consecutively 2013–2015), and Fifth Harmony (who also won consecutively 2016–2018).

A new episode of Danger Force led into the ceremony, while a linear premiere of a new episode of iCarly served as the lead-out.

Appearances 
Prior to the ceremony, Owen Holt and Txunamy hosted an Orange Carpet livestream on the Nickelodeon YouTube channel.

The ceremony featured appearances by celebrities including Jayden Bartels, Brie and Nikki Bella, Sabrina Carpenter, Sofia Carson, Milan Carter, Chance the Rapper, Simon Cowell, Isaiah Crews, Terry Crews, Charli and Dixie D'Amelio, Isla Fisher, Jordan Fisher, Kate Godfrey, Gabrielle Nevaeh Green, Kevin Hart, Samuel L. Jackson, Karl Jacobs, Heidi Klum, Jules LeBlanc, Peyton List, Ralph Macchio, Howie Mandel, Christopher Martinez, Ariana Molkara, MrBeast, Jace Norman, Josh Peck, Charlie Puth, Anton Starkman, Unspeakable, Sofía Vergara, and Xavier Woods. First Lady of the United States, Jill Biden, also made an appearance at the ceremony.

Performers

Winners and nominees 
The nominees were announced and voting opened on March 9, 2022. Voting ended on April 9, 2022. The winners are listed first, highlighted in boldfaced text.

Movies

Television

Music

Sports

Miscellaneous

International 
The following are nominations for awards to be given by Nickelodeon's international networks.

References

External links 
  (archived)
 

Kids' Choice
Kids' Choice Awards
Kids' Choice Awards
Kids' Choice Awards
Nickelodeon Kids' Choice Awards
Television shows directed by Glenn Weiss